Dendromyrmex is a subgenus of carpenter ants. 

Cladogram according to the Catalogue of Life. The species presented are junior synonyms of species in the genus Camponotus:

References 

Formicinae
Insect subgenera